Austin English (born 1983) is an American cartoonist and artist. He works with drawing, painting and comics. His published books include Christina and Charles, The Disgusting Room and the series which he also edited, Windy Corner Magazine published by Sparkplug Books. He recently completed the book Gulag Casual published by 2dcloud. His illustration work can be seen in many publications, including The New York Times. He runs the publishing house Domino Books and has written for The Comics Journal.

Personal life
Austin English was born 1983 in San Francisco, CA

As of January 2009, English lives and works in Brooklyn.

Publications
The Tenth Frame #1-12, 1999-2005, self-published mini-comics
Christina and Charles, 2006, Sparkplug Books (Portland, OR)
Windy Corner Magazine #1-3 (editor), 2007-2009, Sparkplug Books (Portland, OR)
Sweetheart #1-5, 2008-2009, self-published mini-comics
Devotional, 2010, self-published mini comic
The Disgusting Room, 2011, Sparkplug Books (Portland, OR)
The Greatest Fear (series of etchings, 13 editions), 2011, produced by artist
I Used To Live on Ridge Street (series of etchings, 13 editions), 2011, produced by artist
Spider Monkey #1 (w/Jesse McManus), 2012, Domino Books (Brooklyn, NY)
The Life Problem, 2014, Drippybone Books (Los Angeles, CA)
Gulag Casual, 2016, 2dcloud (Minneapolis, MN)
Low Level Enjoyment, 2016, Still Life (Atlanta, GA)
Tanti Affetti,  (forthcoming, 2018)
Meskin and Umezo,  (forthcoming, 2020)

Awards and nominations
2008 Ignatz Award nomination in Promising New Talent for Windy Corner #2 (editor) published by Sparkplug Comic Books
2008 Ignatz Award nomination in Outstanding Anthology or Collection for Windy Corner #2 (editor) published by Sparkplug Comic Books
2013 Ignatz Award nomination in Outstanding Anthology or Collection for Tusen Hjärtan Stark #1 (editor) published by Domino Books
2013 Ignatz Award nomination in Outstanding Comic for The Life Problem published by Drippybone Books

Domino Books
Domino Books is a Brooklyn-based publisher and distributor of artists books, comics, and all types of printed media.  It was founded in 2011 by Austin English.

Works Published by Domino Books:
Dark Tomato #1 by Sakura Maku (2011)
Spider Monkey #1 by Jesse McManus and Austin English (2012)
Difficult Loves by Molly Colleen O'Connell (2013)
Face Man by Clara Bessijelle (2013)
Space Basket by Jonathan Petersen (2013)
Tusen Hjartan Stark #1, edited by Austin English with art by Wiley Guillot, Warren Craghead, Joanna Hellgren and E.A. Bethea (2014)
Tusen Hjartan Stark #2, edited by Austin English with art by Annie Pearlman, Hennessy and E.A. Bethea (2015)
The Social Discipline Reader by Ian Sundahl, edited by Austin English (2015)
Book of Daze by E.A Bethea (2017)

External links 
Art in America Review
Austin English's Website
Domino Books
Huffington Post Review of Gulag Casual and Interview with Austin English

References

1983 births
Living people
Alternative cartoonists
Artists from San Francisco
American cartoonists
Artists from Brooklyn